NGC 6193 (also known as Caldwell 82) is open cluster containing 27 stars in the constellation Ara, visible to the unaided eye. NGC 6193 lies at the center of the Ara OB1 association, which extends over a square degree. The cluster is associated with (and provides the energizing radiation for) neighboring regions of the nebulosity NGC 6188.

Cluster members
NGC 6193 is dominated by two O class multiple star systems within 10" of each other at the centre of the cluster, and a probable binary B0 giant.  There are at least 20 other early B stars in the cluster, of 9th and 10th magnitude.

Image gallery

References

External links

 
 Universität Wien: Plot of stars in NGC 6193 (WEBDA)
  Universität Wien: IDs of stars in NGC 6193 (WEBDA)
 Encyclopedia of Science: Entry for NGC 6193
 
 
 Aladin: Image of NGC 6193, centered on HD 150136

Ara (constellation)
Open clusters
6193
082b